Spondon is an electoral ward in the city of Derby, England.  The ward contains 17 listed buildings that are recorded in the National Heritage List for England.  Of these, one is listed at Grade I, the highest of the three grades, one is at Grade II*, the middle grade, and the others are at Grade II, the lowest grade. The ward contains the former village of Spondon, which is now a suburb to the east of the centre of Derby.  The listed buildings are all near the centre of the original village.  Most of them are hhouses, cottages and associated structures, and the others include a church, a public house, a boundary post, a group of almshouses, and a school.


Key

Buildings

References

Citations

Sources

 

Lists of listed buildings in Derbyshire
Listed buildings in Derby